Euclid Correa (born September 24, 1971) known professionally as Aquiles Correa, is a Dominican actor and stand-up comedian, known for the 'Sanky Panky' trilogy and 'Santi Clo... La vaina de la Navidad'.

Early life
Aquiles Correa was born in September 1971 in Villa Consuelo, the Dominican Republic. His parents are Sonia Martínez and Rafael Correa.

Career
Correa began his career in radio in November 2000. He made his film debut doing a scene in Los locos también piensan (2005) till he landed his Carlitos role in Sanky Panky (2007).

He starred alongside Cheddy Garcia and Colombia Alcantara in the documentary "Amor de Batey", a work that deals with HIV/AIDS incidents in the neighborhood of the Dominican Republic.

References

Stand-up comedians
1971 births
Living people